Sokuri is a round, rimmed woven basket made of finely-split bamboo. It is used for straining washed grains, drying vegetables, or draining fried food in Korea.

It measures between 25 and 50 cm in diameter, and has a standing contour measuring some 4 cm.

Gallery

See also 
 Bamboo weaving
 Wanchojang
 Zaru

References 

Bamboo weaving
Basket weaving
Crafts
Food storage containers
Kitchenware
Korean cuisine
Korean food preparation utensils